Bismarck is a rural community located in Ascensión Municipality, Chihuahua, Mexico. It had a population of 885 inhabitants at the 2010 census, and is situated at an elevation of 1,274 meters above sea level.

References

Populated places in Chihuahua (state)